Johnson is a provincial electoral district in 3 regions of Quebec, Canada that elects members to the National Assembly of Quebec. 
Centre-du-Québec (It includes part of the city of Drummondville, Saint-Germain-de-Grantham, Wickham)
Montérégie (Acton Vale)
Estrie (Roxton Pond, Sainte-Cécile-de-Milton).

It was created for the 1973 election from parts of Bagot, Drummond, Richmond and Shefford electoral districts.

In the change from the 2001 to the 2011 electoral map, it changed its territory considerably, losing its eastern parts including part of the city of Sherbrooke, and gaining territory to the north, including part of the city of Drummondville.

The riding named in honour of former Quebec Premier Daniel Johnson Sr. who served as leader of the province from 1966 until his death in 1968.

Members of the National Assembly

Election results

^ Change is from redistributed results; CAQ change is from ADQ

|-
 
|Liberal
|Denis Morin
|align="right"|8,478
|align="right"|30.99
|align="right"|

|-

|}

References

External links
Information
 Elections Quebec

Election results
 Election results (National Assembly)

Maps
 2011 map (PDF)
 2001 map (Flash)
2001–2011 changes (Flash)
1992–2001 changes (Flash)
 Electoral map of Centre-du-Québec region
 Electoral map of Montérégie region
 Quebec electoral map, 2011

Johnson
Drummondville